Roger-Xavier Lantéri (1930 – 1 January 2022) was a French journalist who specialised in history.

Biography
Lantéri was born in 1930 and graduated from the Centre de formation des journalistes de Paris in 1956. He became a foreign envoy of Agence France-Presse alongside Jean Marin, and was also Deputy Editor-in-Chief of L'Express. He was the husband of Liliane Sichler, a fellow journalist.

Lantéri died on 1 January 2022, at the age of 91.

Works
 Brunehilde : la première reine de France (1995)
 Swane, cœur de loup : roman (1999)
 Les Mérovingiennes (2000)
 Son dernier boogie-woogie : roman (2002)

References

1930 births
2022 deaths
20th-century French journalists
21st-century French journalists